The Maryland Attorney General election of 2022 was held on November 8, 2022, to elect the Attorney General of Maryland. Incumbent Democratic Attorney General Brian Frosh was eligible to seek a third term in office, but announced that he would retire at the end of his term in early 2023.

U.S. Representative Anthony Brown won the Democratic nomination, while far-right lawyer Michael Peroutka won the Republican nomination. As was expected, Brown easily won the general election in this reliably Democratic state.

Democratic primary

Candidates

Nominee
 Anthony Brown, U.S. Representative for Maryland's 4th congressional district (2017–2023), former lieutenant governor (2007–2015), and nominee for governor in 2014

Eliminated in primary
 Katie O'Malley, former Baltimore City District Court Judge (2001–2021), former First Lady of Maryland (2007–2015), and daughter of former Maryland Attorney General J. Joseph Curran Jr.

Declined
 Angela Alsobrooks, Prince George's County executive (2018–present) (ran for re-election; endorsed Brown)
 Vanessa Atterbeary, state delegate for the 13th district (2015–present) (ran for re-election)
 Aisha N. Braveboy, Prince George's County State's Attorney (2019–present) (endorsed Brown)
 Jon S. Cardin, state delegate for the 11th district (2003–2015, 2019–present), nephew of U.S. Senator Ben Cardin, and candidate for attorney general in 2014 (ran for re-election)
 Elizabeth Embry, assistant to incumbent attorney general Brian Frosh and candidate for Baltimore Mayor in 2016 and lieutenant governor in 2018 (ran for Maryland House of Delegates)
 Brian Feldman, state senator from the 15th district (2013–present) (ran for re-election)
 Brian Frosh, incumbent attorney general (retired)
 Will Jawando, Montgomery County councilmember (2018–present) (endorsed Brown)
 John J. McCarthy, Montgomery County State's Attorney (2006–present) (ran for re-election)
 Marilyn Mosby, Baltimore State's Attorney (2015–2023) (ran for re-election)

Endorsements

Debates and forums

Fundraising

Polling

Results

Republican primary

Candidates

Nominee
 Michael Peroutka, former Anne Arundel County councilmember (2014–2018) and Constitution Party nominee for president in 2004

Eliminated in primary
 Jim Shalleck, prosecutor and former chair of the Montgomery County Board of Elections (2015–2021)

Endorsements

Debates and forums

Fundraising

Polling

Results

General election

Debates and forums

Predictions

Endorsements

Fundraising

Polling

Results

Notes

Partisan clients

See also
 Elections in Maryland
 2022 United States elections
 2022 Maryland gubernatorial election
 2022 Maryland Comptroller election
 2022 United States Senate election in Maryland
 2022 United States House of Representatives elections in Maryland

References

External links 
 Anthony Brown (D) for Attorney General
 Michael Peroutka (R) for Attorney General

Attorney General
Maryland
Maryland Attorney General elections